The 2011 Canadian Tour season ran from March to November and consisted of 12 tournaments. It was the 42nd season of the Canadian Professional Golf Tour.

The season started with three events in Latin America (March to May), followed by eight events in Canada (June to August), and ending with one event in the United States (November). Mexican José de Jesús Rodríguez won the Order of Merit.

Schedule
The following table lists official events during the 2011 season.

Order of Merit
The Order of Merit was based on prize money won during the season, calculated in Canadian dollars.

Notes

References

External links
Official site

Canadian Tour
PGA Tour Canada